is a railway station on the Tōhoku Main Line in the town of Rifu, Miyagi, Japan, operated by East Japan Railway Company (JR East).

Lines
Rifu Station is the terminus of the 4.3-kilometer Rifu Branch of the Tōhoku Main Line from Iwakiri Station. Most services operate to and from Sendai Station.

Station layout

Rifu Station has a bay platform. and staffed ticket counter.

History
The station opened on 4 January 1894 as an intermediate station on the Yama Line to Matsushima. On 1 July 1962, services between Rifu Station and Matsushima Station were discontinued, with Rifu becoming a terminus station. From 2 July 1978, the Rifu branch line from Iwakiri was electrified at 20 kV AC. In 2002, a second platform was constructed to handle the additional passenger traffic during the 2002 FIFA World Cup held at the nearby Miyagi Stadium.

Passenger statistics
In fiscal 2018, the station was used by an average of 2,793 passengers daily (boarding passengers only).

Surrounding area
 Miyagi Stadium
 JR East Sendai General Shinkansen Depot

See also
 List of railway stations in Japan

References

External links

 

Railway stations in Miyagi Prefecture
Railway stations in Japan opened in 1894
Wakuya, Miyagi
Tōhoku Main Line
Stations of East Japan Railway Company